Ilze Viņķele (born Ilze Vidiņa on 27 November 1971 in Rēzekne) is a Latvian politician, and the former Minister for Welfare and Minister for Health of Latvia. Currently, she is a member of the political party Movement For!, a part of the Development/For! alliance.

Political activity 
On November 7, 2006, Ilze Viņķele became the Secretary of Parliament of the Special Assignments Ministry for European Union Funds of Latvia. In 2010 she was elected as a member of the 10th Saeima, however, she became the Secretary of Parliament of the Ministry for Finance of Latvia. Viņķele was appointed Minister for Welfare of Latvia on  October 25, 2011. On September, 2012, 54 non-governmental organizations sent a joint letter demanding the resignation of Viņķele over two kindergarten booklets "The Day when Ruth was Richard" and "The Day when Karl was Caroline" whose publishing and distribution the ministry supported.

On July 17, 2017, Viņķele and 4 other MPs (Ints Dālderis, Lolita Čigāne, Andrejs Judins and Aleksejs Loskutovs) left Unity, however she continued to work in the party's parliamentary faction. On August 26, 2017, Viņķele became one of the founders for the political party Movement For! and was elected as its board member. On August 29, 2017, Viņķele stepped down as a member of Saeima, being selected to study at the McCain Institute at the University of Arizona as one of the eight beneficiaries.

On January 5, 2021, Prime Minister Krišjānis Kariņš announced that he would be demanding the resignation of Viņķele as Health Minister due to disagreements over her proposed plan for the distribution of the COVID-19 vaccine in Latvia. On the same day, she accepted the demand, and stepped down on January 7, 2021, with party member Daniels Pavļuts being confirmed to succeed her the same day.

References

External links
 Ministry of Foreign Affairs profile 

1971 births
Living people
People from Rēzekne
For Fatherland and Freedom/LNNK politicians
Civic Union (Latvia) politicians
New Unity politicians
Movement For! politicians
Ministers of Welfare of Latvia
Deputies of the 10th Saeima
Deputies of the 11th Saeima
Deputies of the 12th Saeima
Women government ministers of Latvia
Women deputies of the Saeima
Riga Stradiņš University alumni
21st-century Latvian women politicians